The following highways are numbered 178:

Canada
Prince Edward Island Route 178

Japan
 Japan National Route 178

United States
 Interstate 178 (former proposal)
 U.S. Route 178
 Alabama State Route 178
 Arkansas Highway 178
 California State Route 178
 Connecticut Route 178
 Georgia State Route 178
 Illinois Route 178
 K-178 (Kansas highway)
 Kentucky Route 178
 Louisiana Highway 178
 Maine State Route 178
 Maryland Route 178
 M-178 (Michigan highway) (former)
 Mississippi Highway 178
 New Jersey Route 178 (never built)
 New York State Route 178
 Pennsylvania Route 178 (former)
 Tennessee State Route 178
 Texas State Highway 178
 Texas State Highway Loop 178
 Farm to Market Road 178 (Texas)
 Utah State Route 178
 Virginia State Route 178
 Wisconsin Highway 178
Territories
 Puerto Rico Highway 178